MASwings Sdn Bhd (doing business as MASwings) is a regional airline operating the Rural Air Services (RAS) in East Malaysia. It took over the routes operated by FlyAsianXpress (2006-2007) and the RAS flights by Malaysia Airlines (1965-2006), both being the successors of Borneo Airways (1953-1965). The first flight was on 1 October 2007, which is also the anniversary of the founding of Malaysia Airlines in 1972. 

Its headquarters are located in MAS/MASwings Administration Building, Kota Kinabalu International Airport, Sabah. Previously its head office was located in the Beautiful Jade Centre in Miri.

MASwings is a subsidiary of Malaysia Airlines.

History

Initial services

The airline began its operation on 1 October 2007, concentrating on secondary and tertiary routes within the Malaysian Borneo, inheriting the 22 destinations previously operated by Fly Asian Xpress. During its launch, the airline operated 4 50-seater Fokker 50 and 4 19-seater Twin Otter aircraft.

International expansion

On 2 December 2009, The Star reported that MASwings planned to begin flying to the Philippines, Kalimantan and Sulawesi by the middle of 2010. However, due to certain circumstances, they could not begin flying on some these routes yet, with the exception of Pontianak, Balikpapan and Tarakan, in the Kalimantan region.

On 26 June 2010, MASwings had been exploring the possibility of serving regional routes on the Brunei Indonesia Malaysia Philippines-East Asian Growth Area (BIMP-EAGA), specifically Bandar Seri Begawan in Brunei, Cebu and Davao in the Philippines, Pontianak, Balikpapan and Tarakan in Kalimantan, Sulawesi and Irian Jaya, Indonesia. On 21 December 2010, MASwings' Managing Director Mohd Salleh Ahmad Tabrani confirmed these routes and was waiting for the approval of the relevant authorities.

On 20 November 2011, during MASwings' fourth-anniversary dinner in Kota Kinabalu, CEO Capt Mohd Nawawi Awang announced that the first phase of MASwings' BIMP-EAGA expansion plan will begin in early 2012, with Brunei and Kalimantan as its launching destinations. He said that "the foray into international destinations, would be another milestone in the airlines' history." He also added that it will "pave the way for many more people to travel into Sabah and Sarawak while further intensifying tourist arrivals and business opportunities."

MASwings announced on 5 December 2011 that the Ministry of Transport of Malaysia had approved MASwings' application to fly in the BIMP-EAGA region and the first flights will commence on 1 February 2012.

MASwings unveiled the first four flights in the BIMP-EAGA region on 16 December 2011. The Kota Kinabalu-Bandar Seri Begawan route and the Kuching-Bandar Seri Begawan route will begin on 1 February 2012, while the Kuching-Pontianak route and the Tawau-Tarakan route will begin on 6 and 13 February 2012 respectively. MASwings will provide 14 flights weekly on the Kota Kinabalu-Bandar Seri Begawan route, 7 flights weekly on the Kuching-Pontianak route, and 3 flights weekly on the Kuching-Bandar Seri Begawan route and the Tawau-Tarakan route.

Planned expansion as a regional leisure airline
The airline also considered jet-operations using 737 jet aircraft, enabling the airline to commenced routes to Davao in the Philippines, together with Makassar and Manado in Indonesia, as well as several Chinese destinations from Kota Kinabalu.

Fleet

Current fleet

, MASwings operates the following aircraft:

Former fleet

Fleet replacement

On 9 November 2007, MASwings (through its parent company Malaysia Airlines) signed a Memorandum of Understanding (MoU) for the purchase of 7 ATR 72-500s with options for 3 additional aircraft to expand its services in the states of Sabah and Sarawak in East Malaysia. MASwings received delivery of the first aircraft in 2008, second 6 aircraft in 2009 and remaining 3 (optional) by 2010. On 25 April 2010, its last F50 (9M-MGF) was retired from service.

On 28 February 2012, MASwings made an announcement that they will be replacing their ageing Twin Otters with newer planes, as the request had been sent to the Ministry of Transportation in 2011, and now awaiting final approval. The candidates for the replacement were Viking Air DHC-6 Series 400, Dornier 228NG (New Generation) and GECI SK-105 Skylander. However, with the Skylander project cancelled, it is likely that the candidates would be the Dornier 228NG and the Twin Otter Series 400.

On 18 December 2012, MASwings' parent company, Malaysia Airlines, ordered 36 ATR 72-600 for its subsidiaries. 16 of the ordered aircraft will be delivered to MASwings, while the remaining 20 will enter service with Firefly. For the replacement of the Twin Otter Series 300, six brand-new Twin Otter Series 400 aircraft will enter service in mid-2013.

On 25 July 2013, MASwings received its first ATR 72-600. However, due to cost reasons, all ATR 72-600s later retired from active duties and stored.

Destinations
 
 
Kota Kinabalu - Kota Kinabalu International Airport Main Hub
 Kudat - Kudat Airport  
 Lahad Datu - Lahad Datu Airport
 Sandakan - Sandakan Airport
 Tawau - Tawau Airport
 
 Labuan - Labuan Airport
 
 Miri - Miri Airport Twin-Otter Hub
 Kuching - Kuching International Airport Secondary Hub
 Ba'kelalan - Ba'kelalan Airport
 Bario - Bario Airport
 Bintulu - Bintulu Airport
 Lawas - Lawas Airport
 Limbang - Limbang Airport
 Long Akah - Long Akah Airport
 Long Banga - Long Banga Airport
 Long Lellang - Long Lellang Airport
 Long Seridan - Long Seridan Airport
 Marudi - Marudi Airport
 Mukah - Mukah Airport
 Mulu - Mulu Airport
 Sibu - Sibu Airport
 Sarikei - Tanjung Manis Airport

Terminated Destinations
 
 Bandar Seri Begawan - Brunei International Airport

 
 Balikpapan - Sultan Aji Muhammad Sulaiman Sepinggan Airport
 Pontianak - Supadio Airport
 Tarakan - Juwata Airport

 
Puerto Princesa - Puerto Princesa International Airport

Awards and recognitions
2018: The Malaysia Book of Records for "Longest Operating Hours for Rural Air Services"
2018: The Malaysia Book of Records for "Most Number of Passengers Transported via Rural Air Services"

Incidents and accidents
 10 October 2013 — a de Havilland Canada DHC-6 Twin Otter (9M-MDM), operating as MASwings Flight 3002 from Kota Kinabalu to Kudat, landed short of the runway at Kudat Airport. The aircraft impacted a house and was destroyed. This accident marks the first fatal incident for MASwings, where two people were confirmed dead, including the co-pilot.

References

External links

 
 fleet detail
 fleet age

2007 establishments in Malaysia
Airlines of Malaysia
Malaysia Airlines
Government-owned companies of Malaysia
Airlines established in 2007
Privately held companies of Malaysia